Aristaema utile is a species of plant in the genus Arisaema.

References

utile